HMS Vanguard was a 74-gun third-rate ship of the line of the Royal Navy, launched on 6 March 1787 at Deptford. She was the sixth vessel to bear the name.

In December 1797, Captain Edward Berry was appointed flag captain, flying Rear Admiral Sir Horatio Nelson's flag.

French Revolutionary Wars
On 27 November 1793, the ships of a squadron under the command of Captain Thomas Pasley of  captured Blonde. At the time of her capture Blonde was armed with 28 guns and had a crew of 210 men under the command of Citizen Gueria.

They sailed from Gibraltar on 9 May and on 12 May were struck by a violent gale in the Gulf of Lion that carried away Vanguard's topmasts and foremast. The squadron bore up for Sardinia, Alexander taking Vanguard in tow.

On 19 May, while Nelson was off station repairing his storm damage, Napoleon Bonaparte sailed from Toulon with a force of 72 warships and 400 transports to strike at Egypt with the intention of eventually invading India. On 13 June he occupied Malta and, on 19 June, continued the passage to Egypt arriving off Alexandria on 1 July. On 31 May, Nelson returned to Toulon to find that the French had left 13 days earlier. Searching for the enemy he reached Naples on 17 June and Messina on 20 June. Here he learnt of the fall of Malta and the probable destination of the French. He sailed for Alexandria but overtook the French and arrived on 29 June, two days before them. Finding no enemy he returned to Sicily via Asia Minor. Convinced that the French were going to Egypt he set sail once more for Alexandria.

On the evening of 1 August 1798, half an hour before sunset, the Battle of the Nile began when Nelson attacked the French fleet which was moored in a strong line of battle in Aboukir Bay with gunboats, four frigates, and batteries on Aboukir Island to protect their flanks.  was the leading ship and, followed by four others, she broke through the French line to anchor and fight from the shoreward side. Vanguard remained on the seaward side and soon the French van and centre were being overwhelmed by six ships on either side of their line. The French lost 11 ships of the line and two frigates. Their dead numbered 1700 and the wounded 1500. The British lost 218 killed and 678 wounded. 

Vanguard lost three officers killed, Thomas Seymour and John Taylor, midshipmen, and Captain Faddy of the marines. Lieutenants N. Vassal and J. Ayde, J. Campbell, the Admiral's secretary, M. Austin, the boatswain, and J. Weatherspoon and George Antrim, midshipmen, were wounded. Twenty seamen and seven marines were killed and sixty seamen and eight marines were wounded. Nelson was also wounded. On 3 August the captains of the squadron met on board Orion and agreed to present Nelson with a sword.

Vanguard sailed for Naples on 19 August and arrived on 22 September. The King of Naples came out to meet her.

In September, Captain Thomas Hardy took command, still under Nelson's flag. Two months later a formidable French army had invaded Naples and on 16 December Vanguard was shifted out of gunshot of the ports. On 20 December Nelson, in order to evacuate the royal family and other important people, ordered the small barge of Vanguard, covered by three barges and the frigate , armed with cutlasses only, to be at the Victoria wharf. All the other boats of Vanguard and Alcmene, and the launches and carronades, were ordered to assemble on board Vanguard under the direction of Captain Hardy and row halfway to the Mola Figlio.

By 21 December the Neapolitan Royal Family, the British Ambassador and his family, several Neapolitan nobles and most of the English gentlemen and merchants had been embarked, numbering in all about 600 persons in the ships of the squadron. Vanguard sailed on 23 December and arrived, after a stormy passage, in Palermo on 26 December.

The ship had been the scene of the death of Prince Alberto of Naples and Sicily, one of the royal entourage on board, son of King Ferdinand VI and his wife Maria Carolina of Austria who were on board. Other royals on board were the Duke of Calabria, Prince of Salerno and their sisters the Princesses Maria Cristina, Maria Amalia and Princess Maria Antonia

In 1800, Vanguard was taken out of commission at Portsmouth.

In 1801, under the command of Captain Sir Thomas Williams. Vanguard sailed from Portsmouth on 20 April to join the Baltic fleet. The fleet, under Vice Admiral Pole, returned on 10 August. Vanguard, and  sailed again on 19 August to cruise off Cádiz. The first four were victualled and provisioned for five months at Gibraltar and sailed for Jamaica in December.  followed them as soon as she had watered at Tetuan.

Napoleonic Wars
In 1803, under the command of Captain James Walker, Vanguard was operating out of Jamaica on the Blockade of Saint-Domingue. On 30 June,  and her squadron under Captain Henry William Bayntun were between Jean-Rabel and St. Nichola Mole in the West Indies, having just parted with a convoy when they spotted a sail of what appeared to be a large French warship. Cumberland and Vanguard approached her and after a few shots from Vanguard the French vessel surrendered, having suffered two men badly wounded, and being greatly outgunned. She proved to be the frigate Créole, of 44 guns, primarily 18-pounders, under the command of Citizen Le Ballard. She had been sailing from Cape François to Port au Prince with General Morgan (the second in command in San Domingo), his staff, and 530 soldiers, in addition to her crew of 150 men. The Royal Navy took her into service as HMS Creole.

While the British were taking possession of Créole, a small French navy schooner, under the command of a lieutenant and sailing the same course as Créole, sailed into the squadron; she too was seized. She had on board 100 bloodhounds from Cuba, which were "intended to accompany the Army serving against the Blacks."

On 2 July 1803, Bayntun's squadron captured the French privateer Superieure. Vanguard was the actual captor. The squadron also captured the privateer Poisson Vollant, which the Royal Navy also took into service.

The French ships separated during the night but the British overtook Duquesne the following day and captured her after a short exchange of fire with Vanguard, which lost one man killed and one wounded. The prize was broken up on arrival in England after being damaged running on to the Morant Cays.

In September the French troops in northwest Saint Domingue were being closely pressed by the rebel slaves under General Jean-Jacques Dessalines. Captain Walker, off the Mole St. Nicholas, persuaded the General not to put the garrison of Saint-Marc to death but to march them to the Mole in safety where Vanguard would take possession of the shipping in the bay. The 850 men of the garrison, all very emaciated, were successfully evacuated, and the brig , pierced for 12 guns but only mounting 6, the brig Trois Amis, transport, and the schooner Mary Sally with 40 or 50 barrels of powder were brought out. The British took Papillon into service under her existing name. Then on 5 September Vanguard captured the French navy's schooner Courier de Nantes, of two guns and four swivel guns. She had a crew of 15 men under the command of an enseigne de vaisseau, and was carrying 30 barrels of flour to Saint-Marc.

Vanguard captured the American schooner Independence on 16 November. Six days later Vanguard took the two French schooners Rosalle, laden with saltpeter and lignum vitae, and St Rosario.

Fate
Vanguard was paid off by the end of 1805. In 1807 she was repaired at Plymouth.

On 16 November 1807 , of London, was returning to London from Petersburg when she was on shore on the Middle Ground.  and boats from Vanguard were able to get Leeds off after she had been stuck for 36 hours.

Under the command of Captain Thomas Baker, Vanguard became the flagship of Rear Admiral Thomas Bertie in 1808. In 1812 she was made a prison ship at Plymouth and in 1814 she became a powder hulk. Vanguard was broken up in 1821.

Legacy

The American investment firm Vanguard takes its name from HMS Vanguard after founder John Bogle chose the name from an antique book chronicling historical British naval achievements. A likeness of the ship served as the company's logo from 1981 to 2020.

Sails of Glory: Napoleonic Wars miniatures by Ares Games includes HMS Vanguard as one of the ships in its starter set. It is the British counterpart to the French ship-of-the-line Genereux.

Notes

Citations

References

 
 Lavery, Brian (2003) The Ship of the Line - Volume 1: The development of the battlefleet 1650–1850. Conway Maritime Press. .
 Winfield, Rif & Stephen S Roberts (2015) French Warships in the Age of Sail 1786 - 1861: Design Construction, Careers and Fates. (Seaforth Publishing).

External links
 

 

Ships of the line of the Royal Navy
Arrogant-class ships of the line
1787 ships